The 2014–15 NCAA Division I women's ice hockey season began in October 2014 and ended with the 2015 NCAA Division I women's ice hockey tournament's championship game in March 2015.

Pre-season polls

The top 10 from USCHO.com, September 22, 2014, and the top 10 from USA Today/USA Hockey Magazine, First place votes are in parentheses.

Regular season

Standings

Player stats

Scoring leaders
The following players lead the NCAA in points at the conclusion of games played on March 24, 2015.

Leading goaltenders
The following goaltenders lead the NCAA in goals against average at the conclusion of games played on March 24, 2015 while playing at least 33% of their team's total minutes.

Awards

WCHA

CHA

Hockey East

ECAC

Patty Kazmaier Award

AHCA Coach of the Year

References

2014–15 NCAA Division I women's hockey season
NCAA
NCAA Division I women's ice hockey seasons